The Lost Files is an album by rap group Digital Underground, released in 1999. It features unreleased tracks that were not included on previous albums.

Track listing 
 "On One"
 "X For the Ear"
 "People Over the Stairs"
 "Mind Bubble"
 "Voodoo Woman"
 "How Long"
 "Nothing has Changed"
 "Phone Call Away"
 "Strawberry Letter 23"
 "I Been Watching You"
 "Know Me Feel Me"

References

Digital Underground albums
Tupac Shakur
1999 compilation albums